Tillandsia mooreana is a species of flowering plant in the genus Tillandsia. This species is endemic to Mexico.

Cultivars
 × Vrieslandsia 'Harmony'
 × Vrieslandsia 'Harmony Too'
 Tillandsia ‘Samantha’

References

BSI Cultivar Registry Retrieved 11 October 2009

mooreana
Flora of Mexico